Dingle Distillery is an Irish whiskey distillery established in 2012 and billing itself as an 'artisan' distillery. The distillery is located in a converted sawmill in Milltown on the outskirts of Dingle, in a Gaeltacht (Irish-speaking region) in the southwest of Ireland. The first whiskeys distilled and matured at the distillery were released in late 2016. In addition to whiskey, the distillery also produces and markets Dingle vodka and Dingle Gin. 

In 2017, Dingle Distillery became the first independent Irish distillery to release a single pot still whiskey in several decades.

Background
The Irish whiskey industry suffered a period of severe decline in the 20th century, which saw most of Ireland's distilleries close, and those remaining in operation amalgamating under the ownership of a single company, Irish Distillers, in the 1970s. However, since then, Ireland's whiskey industry has undergone a resurgence, in particular since 2010, with a diversification of both output and ownership. 

With the number of operating distilleries in the country having fallen to just two in the 1980s, Ireland now boasts sixteen operating distilleries, with many others planned. When it opened, the Dingle Distillery was Ireland's fifth, joining the New Midleton Distillery (where Jameson, Powers and Paddy are produced, among others), Bushmills, Cooley, and Kilbeggan.

History
The initiative to start a distillery in Dingle was that of the now deceased Oliver Hughes, who was also a founder of the Porterhouse brewing and restaurant group. The site, formerly the Fitzgerald sawmill, was converted for whiskey production in 2012, opening on 29 November. The distillery was reported to have created at least 25 jobs, with more anticipated with the launch of a visitors' centre. The new copper pot stills used at the distillery were designed by John McDougall.

As a promotion to attract investors, Dingle Distillery offered the first five hundred special casks to investors "Founding Fathers", to be ready for bottling from November 2017.

The distillery announced plans to double spirit production in 2018.

Products
Using pot stills the distillery produces two casks of whiskey per day in Dingle, where the mildly cool climate is reportedly favourable for whiskey production. Under Irish law, to be termed whiskey, a spirit is legally required to be matured for at least three years. Therefore, Dingle Distillery only brought whiskey to market in late 2016. The distillery also has a still for the production of gin and vodka. As of 2017, 100,000 bottles per year of Dingle gin are being sold. 

The first batch of whiskey was released in late 2016, and consisted of two tripled distilled whiskeys, both of which were matured solely in bourbon casks: 
 Dingle Single Malt Whiskey, 46.5% (7,500 bottles)
 Dingle Single Malt Whiskey Cask Strength, 60.7% (500 bottles)
The second batch, released in 2017, consisted of four different bottlings, three single malts and a single pot still whiskey:
 Dingle Pot Still Whiskey, 46.5% (800 bottles) - Matured exclusively in Pedro Ximenez casks.
 Dingle Single Malt Whiskey, 46.5% (6,000 bottles) - Matured in Pedro Ximenez and Oloroso sherry casks, as well as bourbon casks.
 Dingle Single Malt Whiskey Cask Strength, 60.2% (500 bottles) - Matured in bourbon, Oloroso and Pedro Ximinez casks.
 Dingle Single Malt Whiskey Cask Strength, 46.5% (700 bottles) - Matured in a marriage of port and bourbon casks.

References

Distilleries in the Republic of Ireland
Tourist attractions in County Kerry
Irish companies established in 2012